Go Bus Transport Ltd is a large bus company in New Zealand owned by Australian-based transport operator Kinetic Group. The company is based in Hamilton, New Zealand, and runs bus services in Hamilton, Hawke's Bay, Tauranga, Christchurch, Gisborne, Dunedin and Invercargill.

In March 2020, it was announced the company and its 1700 buses would be sold to Kinetic Group, who is also the operator of Auckland SkyBus, subject to Overseas Investment Office approval. Approval was given in June and the acquisition was completed in August 2020.

History
In 2004, Go Bus was formed by the merger of C.J. Worth Ltd., trading as Blue Worth Coachlines and Hamilton City Buses (privatised in the 1990s), Simpsons and Hodgsons. Craig Worth was still commercial director in 2019.

Original constituent companies

Buses Ltd 
Buses Ltd was one of the companies forming Go Bus. It was formed in 1927 by the amalgamation of Blue Bus Co Ltd and Branton & Hodgson Public Motors. Rawlinson & Branton Bros. had run Hamilton-Frankton buses as Waikato Motor Co. from about 1914 and to Ngāruawāhia from 1924. By 1928 Buses Ltd was described as having a virtual monopoly of Hamilton buses. Buses Ltd was bought by Hamilton City Council in about 1980 and renamed Hamilton City Buses Ltd.

Lewis Hodgson Motor Services 
Hodgson's of Te Awamutu, was another of the companies forming Go Bus. It was incorporated on 23 Feb 1937 and dissolved on 1 Jan 2005. Prior to that, in 1932 Lewis Hodgson had started a Kihikihi to Te Awamutu railway station service, took over the Pirongia, Whatawhata and Hamilton route, which had been running from 1926 and was still running in 1942 and ran buses to Tokanui from 1933. Lewis' son, Reece Hodgson, was killed while driving a Te Awamutu-Tauranga excursion in 1950. The 1936 brick and concrete, art deco garage in Te Awamutu was in use until 2020, when it was advertised for sale. It remained in 2021, but was to be replaced by 16 houses.

Simpsons 
Simpsons ran Huntly buses from at least 1929. Simpsons Bus Services Limited operated from 1978 to 1998 and from then to 2008. The bus operations were sold in 2003, when the company had 34 buses.

Controlling shareholders 
Wellington investment group Morrison and Co. had become a 41% shareholder by 2005.

In 2007, Direct Capital bought 87% of GoBus. The other 13% remained with GoBus managers and directors. GoBus then had 410 vehicles, 4 workshops, 8 depots and 460 staff. By 2010, it had 650 buses and over 700 staff. From 2007 to 2012, GoBus more than doubled its fleet and increased its staff to 950. Direct put GoBus up for sale, saying it needed more capital to continue expanding.

In 2012, another private equity fund, Australia's Next Capital, bought Direct's 86.8% of GoBus for $84.6m.

In 2014, Ngāi Tahu Holdings Corp (⅔) and Tainui Group Holdings (⅓) bought Go Bus for a reported $170m.

In 2020, Ngāi Tahu Holdings and Tainui Group Holdings agreed to sell passenger transport company Go Bus to Melbourne-based industry operator Kinetic. The sale was finalised in August 2020.

Expansion 
Some growth has been by acquisition of bus companies (see below), some by winning new contracts. Among the latter have been –
 2009 contract for Napier and Hastings, renewed in 2015 after a 60% growth in passengers.
 2009 Tauranga $7.5m ($3m less than previous operator, Bayline Coaches) 5½ year contract with Environment Bay of Plenty Bay. Bayline had run 25 buses daily, but the new service used 35 buses and 42 staff, with depots in Tauranga, Mt Maunganui and Te Puke.
 2013 won Gisborne contract by cutting the $320,000 a year Waipawa Red Bus service to $217,776 (plus $5,000 for cycle racks in the first year),  with two air-conditioned 27-seat 'GizzyBuses' and a reduced timetable. GoBus also tendered for large buses at $225,941 a year.
 2015 won 8 bus Gisborne school contract from Waipawa.

Acquired bus companies

Christchurch Bus Services 
Christchurch Bus Services Ltd operated Metro routes for Environment Canterbury in Christchurch and Timaru, as well as private charter services for groups and schools. It was purchased in December 2010 by Go Bus.

Urban Cat
In July 2013, Go Bus Transport took over the 'Urban Cat' Christchurch urban bus operations of Leopard Coachlines, gaining around 90 buses.

Hawarden Garage
Based in Kaiapoi, Hawarden Garage & Transport Co Ltd was bought at the end of 2013.

Invercargill Passenger Transport
In April 2014, Go Bus took over Invercargill Passenger Transport, which at that time was trading as Passenger Transport Citibus throughout the southern South Island.

Johnston's Coachlines 
In August 2016, Go Bus announced that they had acquired Johnston's Coachlines for an undisclosed sum. Johnston's is a tourism-based bus company with depots in Auckland, Christchurch and Queenstown. The main purpose of the acquisition was the company's experience in the high-end tour market. It was stated that the companies will operate in a parent-subsidiary manner, as Johnston's will retain its own brand and division. The purchase did not include Johnston's Gray Line tours.

References

External links
 Go Bus Transport Ltd website
1990 photo of Hodgson's Te Awamutu garage

Bus companies of New Zealand
Companies based in Hamilton, New Zealand
Kinetic Group companies